Edinburgh Napier University is a public university in Edinburgh, Scotland. Napier Technical College, the predecessor of the university, was founded in 1964, taking its name from 16th-century Scottish mathematician and philosopher John Napier. The technical college was inaugurated as a university in 1992 by Lord Douglas-Hamilton, becoming Napier University. In 2009, the university was renamed Edinburgh Napier University.

The university is based around its three main Edinburgh campuses: Merchiston, Craiglockhart and Sighthill. It has over 19,500 students, including those on-campus in Scotland and others studying on transnational programmes abroad and online. In 2018 this included nearly 9,500 international and EU students, from more than 140 nations worldwide.

History
Napier Technical College was founded in 1964, taking its name from John Napier, who was born in 1550 in the medieval tower house of Merchiston Castle (the site of the university's Merchiston campus). His statue stands in the tower of Merchiston Castle today. An opening ceremony was held on 23 February 1965. In 1966, it was renamed Napier College of Science and Technology. In 1974, it merged with the Sighthill-based Edinburgh College of Commerce to form Napier College of Commerce and Technology, which became a Central Institution in 1985.

The college was renamed Napier Polytechnic in 1986 and in the same year acquired the former Hydropathic hospital buildings at Craiglockhart. In June 1992, the institution officially became Napier University. At a ceremony witnessed by over 700 staff and students, Lord James Douglas Hamilton and the then Principal, William Turmeau, unveiled the new university sign at Merchiston. In 1994, Napier University acquired its Craighouse Campus. In 1996, the university gained a new Faculty of Health Studies through a merger between the Scottish Borders College of Nursing and Lothian College of Health Studies. In February 2009, it became Edinburgh Napier University.

Edinburgh Napier has been awarded the Queen's Anniversary Prize twice. Its most recent win came in 2015, when it was recognised for its work in timber engineering, sustainable construction and wood science. Edinburgh Napier was previously awarded the Queen's Anniversary Prize in 2009 when the award was made for 'Innovative housing construction for environmental benefit and quality of life'. This recognised the contribution made by the university's Building Performance Centre towards improving sound insulation between attached dwellings.

The motto of the university, Nisi sapientia frustra (meaning "Without knowledge, [all is] in vain"), echoes the motto of the City of Edinburgh, Nisi Dominus frustra (meaning "Without [the] Lord, [all is] in vain"). Edinburgh Napier's Tartan was launched at the same time as the name change in February 2009. Previously, the university used the Clan Napier Tartan; the Chief of Clan Napier welcomed the new university tartan.

Campuses
The university is based around its three main campuses at Merchiston, Craiglockhart and Sighthill.

Sighthill Campus 

The Sighthill Campus opened to students in the School of Health & Social Care and School of Applied Sciences in January 2011. The campus includes a five-storey learning resource centre, 25 specialised teaching rooms including clinical skills laboratories, three IT-enabled lecture theatres and seminar rooms, a clinical skills suite and integrated sports facilities. The campus has been certified as BREEAM Excellent for best practice in sustainable design.

The Sighthill campus is also home to a new sports facility which includes a biomechanics laboratory and an environmental chamber which can recreate high altitude conditions with controllable temperature and humidity levels to simulate varying climatic conditions. In 2016, the gym facilities at Sighthill became home to the SRU Fosroc Scottish Rugby Academy Edinburgh.

Craiglockhart Campus 

The Craiglockhart Campus is home to The Business School. It incorporates the Craiglockhart Hydropathic Hospital buildings which were for a time known as Craiglockhart War Hospital, where First World War poets Wilfred Owen and Siegfried Sassoon were treated. The Craiglockhart Campus exhibits photography, writing, film and memorabilia to provide a glimpse into the minds of the poets, patients and medical staff at Craiglockhart. The exhibition also provides War Poets Collection based on the work of Siegfried Sassoon, Wilfred Owen and selected contemporary poets. The exhibition was officially opened on 11 November 2005 by BBC's World Affairs Correspondent, Allan Little. This campus is the home of the law and business courses and is also operates as a conference centre. The Craiglockhart Campus was extensively refurbished and extended in 2004 and contains two lecture theatres, language labs, computing facilities and an extensive library.

Merchiston Campus 

The Merchiston Campus is home to the Schools of Art & Creative Industries, Computing and Engineering & the Built Environment. It is built around the refurbished shell of Merchiston Castle, the family home of John Napier, after whom the university is named. Merchiston Castle is also the ancient seat of Clan Napier. Merchiston Castle is currently a "Category A" listed building in Scotland due to its national significance. The campus also includes the 500-seat, 24-hour Jack Kilby Computing Centre, named after the inventor of integrated circuits and the handheld calculator. Facilities for students include a computer game laboratory, professional music studios and in 2016, TV presenter and University alumna Lorraine Kelly officially opened a new integrated broadcast journalism newsroom.

Edinburgh Napier Students' Association (ENSA) is located at the Merchiston Campus.

Accommodation
Edinburgh Napier has student accommodation located at three sites across the city: Bainfield in Fountainbridge (opened 2014), Slateford Road (opened 2015) and Orwell Terrace (opened 2016).

Edinburgh Napier also provides assistance to students looking to rent in the private sector.

Organisation and governance 
Edinburgh Napier University comprises five specialist schools:

 School of Applied Sciences
 School of Arts & Creative Industries
 Business School
 School of Computing, Engineering & the Built Environment 
 School of Health & Social Care

Governance
Edinburgh Napier University's principal and vice-chancellor is Professor Andrea Nolan OBE.

The chancellor is Will Whitehorn, who was installed in August 2021. The Edinburgh-born president of industry group UKspace is also a former executive at the Virgin Group, and also holds boardroom roles at The Scottish Gallery Employee Ownership Trust, Scottish Event Campus, Craneware, Good Energy and AAC Clyde Space AB.

Whitehorn succeeded Edinburgh Napier alumnus David Eustace, who studied photography at the university before going on to become a renowned fashion, celebrity and art photographer, and was chancellor between 2015 and 2021. He succeeded Tim Waterstone, founder of Waterstone's Booksellers, who served from 2007 to 2015. Edinburgh Napier's first chancellor was Viscount Younger of Leckie, who died in January 2003.

Academic profile
Edinburgh Napier offers subjects including engineering, computing, nursing and midwifery, science, business, timber engineering and transport studies. It offers a range of creative courses, including film, graphic design, music, acting, publishing and product design.

Edinburgh Napier University is an internationally award-winning institution that has been twice recognised by the Queen's Anniversary Prize for Higher and Further Education (in 2009 and 2015) for its work in timber engineering, sustainable construction and wood science.

Screen Academy Scotland is a ScreenSkills-approved training provider and is a collaboration between Edinburgh Napier University and Edinburgh College of Art (eca). Patrons of the academy include Dame Judi Dench and Brian Cox, with Tilda Swinton an ambassador.

Rankings

Edinburgh Napier ranks 401 – 500th in the Times World University rankings. It is also rated five stars for teaching, internationalisation and employability by the QS Stars international university rankings. In the Times and The Sunday Times Good University Guide 2021, Edinburgh Napier was ranked the top modern university in Scotland while the 2020 National Student Survey ranked the institution number one for student satisfaction in Edinburgh. In The Guardian University Guide 2017, the university was ranked top in the UK for adding value to students. This score is calculated by tracking students from enrolment to graduation and compares their final degree award with their qualifications upon entry.

Research and knowledge transfer 
Edinburgh Napier has a wide range of research centres and institutes including:
Institute for Sustainable Construction
 Transport Research Institute
Centre for Distributed Computing, Networking and Security
The Mountain Bike Centre of Scotland
Scottish Centre for the Book

The Scottish Institute for Policing Research (SIPR), a collaboration between Police Scotland, the Scottish Police Authority, and 14 Scottish universities is currently hosted by Edinburgh Napier University.

In September 2018, Edinburgh Napier partnered with Blockpass, a blockchain-based self-sovereign identity protocol, to launch the Blockpass Identity Lab (BIL) - a research lab focused around cryptography and blockchain technology. The lab is intended to lead to the development of various blockchain applications for use in identity solutions.

Transnational education (TNE) 
Edinburgh Napier has partnerships to deliver courses with higher education institutions around the world and is the largest UK provider of higher education in Hong Kong. TNE partnerships are currently in place with institutions in:
 China
 Hong Kong
 Sri Lanka
 Singapore
 Switzerland
 Myanmar

The university also has offices in Beijing and Hyderabad.

Student life 
Edinburgh Napier University's students' union is Edinburgh Napier Students' Association. The current student president is Ankit Duggal.

Following a student referendum in 2014, the association changed its name from Napier Students' Association (NSA) to Edinburgh Napier Students' Association (ENSA).

The Students' Association is a fully constituted, independent association providing student representation and confidential welfare advice, as well as supporting a variety of sporting and cultural societies, under the banner 'Team Napier'.

The Union Bar is located above the Three Sisters bar in the Cowgate, Edinburgh.

The student newspaper, Veritas, is no longer published. It was founded as a tabloid newspaper in 1993 by Neil McIntosh. Past Veritas editors include Craig McGill, Alan 'GtB' Brown, Robin Wynn and Gareth Mackie. Students now receive a monthly newsletter via email instead.

As an Edinburgh Napier student, the opportunity is presented to apply for paid employment as a Student Ambassador on a zero-hour contract as long as the student has at least one year left on their degree.

Midwifery Programme 
In April 2022, a "Skills Workbook", published by the university's midwifery programme and used to educated students, was posted online. The workbook dealt with catheterisation, and told students "while most times the pregnant or birthing person will have female genitalia, you may be caring for a person who has transitioned from male to female and may therefore still have external male genitalia".

In response to the claims made by the university's workbook, Elaine Miller, a Fellow of the Chartered Society of Physiotherapy, stated:  "it is not possible for a male person to get pregnant".
Dr. Susan Bewley, Professor Emeritus in Obstetrics and Women's Health at King's College London called the materials "puzzling", and further stated "The writers seem to have left school remarkably ignorant of basic biology, sex, and anatomy".

Notable people

See also
 Armorial of UK universities
 Fresh Air (Edinburgh)
 List of universities in the United Kingdom
 Universities in Scotland

References

 
Florence Network
Educational institutions established in 1964
1964 establishments in Scotland
Educational institutions established in 1992
1992 establishments in Scotland
Universities UK